Desulfovibrio brasiliensis is a moderately halophilic bacteria first isolated from Brazil, hence its name. It is sulfate-reducing, 0.3–0.45micrometres wide and 1.0–3.5 micrometres long, Gram-negative and motile (one subpolar flagellum present).

References

Further reading
Staley, James T., et al. "Bergey's manual of systematic bacteriology, vol. 3. "Williams and Wilkins, Baltimore, MD (2012).

External links 
WORMS

Type strain of Desulfovibrio brasiliensis at BacDive -  the Bacterial Diversity Metadatabase

Desulfovibrio